Belvedere House may mean:
Belvedere House and Gardens, a famous country house in county Westmeath, Ireland
Belvedere House, Erith, London
Belvedere House on Belvedere Estate, a house in Calcutta, India that housed government officials in the colonial era
 Belvidere House, original of Belvidere Hospital, Glasgow
Belvedere House (Dublin), a townhouse in Dublin, Ireland